A Weather is an American indie rock band from Portland, Oregon, fronted by Aaron Gerber and Sarah Winchester. Other members include Zach Boyle, Aaron Krenkel and Louis Thomas. Their debut album, Cove (2008), was described as "tenderly crafted chamber pop" and "bursting with intricately plotted melodies and lush arrangements", and was released to favourable reviews.

In 2007, the band toured in the United States with Bright Eyes.

In March 2010, A Weather released its second studio record entitled Everyday Balloons.

Discography
 Cove (2008, Team Love)
 Everyday Balloons (2010, Team Love)

References

External links
Official site
MySpace

Team Love Records artists